The Substitute is a 1996 American crime action thriller film  directed by Robert Mandel and starring Tom Berenger, Ernie Hudson, Marc Anthony, William Forsythe, Raymond Cruz and Luis Guzmán.
It was filmed at Miami Sr. High school.

Plot
Jonathan Shale is a mercenary and a Vietnam veteran. After a botched covert operation in Cuba in which three men from his platoon were killed, he returns home to Miami. He surprises his girlfriend, Jane Hetzko, at her apartment; she welcomes him warmly. Hetzko is a schoolteacher at inner-city Columbus High School, an institution with a considerable gang problem.

She is particularly disliked by Juan Lacas, leader of the Kings of Destruction gang (KOD). While jogging one morning, Hetzko is attacked and has her leg broken. Hetzko and Shale believe this to be related to the KOD, which prompts the latter to go undercover as an Ivy League-educated, government-affiliated substitute teacher for his girlfriend's class.

Shale arrives at Columbus High School and is taken aback at first by the lowly conditions. He is unable to control his class of poorly educated and poorly behaved students on the first day, but decides to use his street smarts and military tactics to gain the upper hand. Soon enough, he is able to take command of the students by displaying his combat self-defense techniques when students attack him.

He is warned not to use such methods by the principal, Claude Rolle, but gains the respect of his students when he bonds with them over the similarities between his early gang and Vietnam War experiences and their involvement in petty crime and street gangs. During this time, he befriends fellow schoolteacher Darrell Sherman and also crosses paths with Lacas, who is also one of his students.

Suspicious of the odd conditions within the high school, Shale sets up surveillance cameras throughout the building. He discovers that Lacas orchestrated the attack on Hetzko. He also discovers that Lacas is secretly working with Rolle to distribute cocaine around Miami for a major narcotics ring. Shale and his team raid a drug deal, using the stolen money to buy music and sports equipment in the form of a "school donation."

While Sherman initially denies Shale's discovery, accusing him of being racist and trying to tear down the good works of Principal Rolle—which he only does to keep himself at a distance and cover up a money-laundering avenue for Rolle's criminal enterprises—Sherman and a female student inadvertently witness the drugs being loaded into one of the school buses later that day. Sherman tells the student to warn Shale and Hetzko, and creates a distraction, sacrificing himself.

Aware of Shale's interference at this point, Rolle orders a "car accident" for him, and sends Lacas after Hetzko. With the help of another student, Sherman is killed by Rolle. Shale and Brown save Hetzko by fighting and killing Lacas, and learn the full story from the female witness. Shale and his team garrison the school grounds to enter combat against the remaining KOD members, along with Johnny Glades, a Native American crime lord who wants his stolen money back from the busted deal; a rival mercenary company led by Janus; and Rolle himself. Ultimately, Shale and Joey Six kill all of the dealers and end up as the sole survivors of the battle. They walk away from the school grounds, discussing future operations as substitute teachers.

Cast

Soundtrack

A soundtrack containing hip hop music was released on April 9, 1996 by Priority Records. It peaked at #90 on the Billboard 200 and #18 on the Top R&B/Hip-Hop Albums.

Release
The Substitute premiered in New York and Los Angeles on April 19, 1996.

Home media
The movie was originally released in the United States on Laserdisc in 1996 and on DVD on June 18, 1997 by Artisan Entertainment. It was re-released on DVD and bundled with The Substitute 3: Winner Takes All in 2000. As of 2020, the film was released on Blu-ray Disc in a few European countries, including Germany, in 2015 by NSM Records.

Reception

Box office
In the United States and Canada, the film grossed $6.1 million on the first weekend, finishing second at the box office. In its second weekend, The Substitute made $2,705,358 in 1,762 theaters (a total of $10.4 million over the ten-day period), falling to eighth position. It then made $1,084,881 on its third weekend, a 60% drop, in 1,130 theaters, and $451,525 on its fourth weekend, finishing twentieth. On its fifth weekend, it made $439,025, a 3% decrease, with a total gross of $13.7 million. It ran in wide release (600+ theatres) for four weeks.

Critical response
The Substitute holds a rating of 42% on Rotten Tomatoes from 26 critics.

Roger Ebert gave the film one star out of four, writing: "I am so very tired of this movie. I see it at least once a month. The title changes, the actors change, and the superficial details of the story change, but it is always about exactly the same thing: heavily armed men shooting at one another. Even the order of their deaths is preordained: First the extras die, then the bit players, then the featured actors, until finally only the hero and the villain are left." James Berardinelli gave the film two stars out of four, writing: "The Substitute has its moments, all of which fall in the realm of high camp. ... Nevertheless, aside from a lot of only moderately-satisfying violence, The Substitute comes across as rather lame. It's not boring, but that dubious qualification isn't enough to earn the movie a passing grade."

In an article about films about troubled teens, The A.V. Club stated: "There have been plenty of movies about white people coming into inner-city schools and whipping the students into shape, but nothing quite like The Substitute, which brings the subtly racist, paternalistic elements of those films right to the surface."

A more positive review came from Kevin Thomas, who wrote: "There's a sense of shrewd observation throughout The Substitute that makes it come alive and seem quite a few cuts above such usual genre fare." Similarly, Mick LaSalle wrote: "The Substitute is a guilty pleasure, but it's not garbage. Berenger brings to the role an appealing ruggedness and world-weariness, and Ernie Hudson, as the corrupt principal, is sleazy and elegant. The script isn't bad, either. The first meeting between Shale and the principal, in which they size each other up, is superb, and, throughout, the outlandish premise is handled with straight-faced intelligence."

Sequels
Three direct-to-DVD sequels were made, with Treat Williams replacing Tom Berenger:

The Substitute 2: School's Out (1998)
The Substitute 3: Winner Takes All (1999)
The Substitute: Failure Is Not an Option (2001)

See also 
 List of hood films

References

External links
 

1996 films
1996 action thriller films
1996 crime thriller films
1990s crime action films
1990s English-language films
1990s high school films
American action thriller films
American crime action films
American crime thriller films
American high school films
American teen films
Artisan Entertainment films
Films about educators
Films about mercenaries
Films about school violence
Films directed by Robert Mandel
Films scored by Gary Chang
Films set in Miami
Films shot in Miami
Hood films
Orion Pictures films
The Substitute films
1990s American films